Celotes is a genus of skippers in the family Hesperiidae.

Species
Celotes limpia Burns, 1974
Celotes nessus (Edwards, 1877)
Celotes spurcus A.D.Warren, Steinhauser, Hernández-Mejía & Grishin, 2008

References
Natural History Museum Lepidoptera genus database

Pyrgini
Hesperiidae genera
Taxa named by Frederick DuCane Godman
Taxa named by Osbert Salvin